Raj Niwas (translation: Government Abode) is the official residence of the Lieutenant Governor of the Andaman and Nicobar Islands. It is located in the capital city of Port Blair, Andaman and Nicobar Islands. The present lieutenant governor of Andaman and Nicobar Islands is Admiral Devendra Kumar Joshi (Retd.), PVSM, AVSM, YSM, NM, VSM (Retd.)

See also
 List of official residences of India

Governors' houses in India
Government of the Andaman and Nicobar Islands
Buildings and structures in the Andaman and Nicobar Islands
Port Blair